Long Prairie Township is an inactive township in Mississippi County, in the U.S. state of Missouri.

Long Prairie Township was established in 1858, and named for a prairie of the same name within its borders.

References

Townships in Missouri
Townships in Mississippi County, Missouri